Parietals may refer to:

 A reptilian diagnostic term, see parietal scales.
 Parietal cells, stomach epithelium cells that secrete gastric acid and intrinsic factor to aid in digestion.
 The parietal bone.